Hilmo is a town in the central Galguduud region of Somalia.

References
Hilmo: Somalia

Populated places in Mudug